Jefferson Township is an inactive township in Polk County, in the U.S. state of Missouri.

Jefferson Township has the name of President Thomas Jefferson.

References

Townships in Missouri
Townships in Polk County, Missouri